Hardage is a surname. Notable people with the surname include:

Joe Hardage (1869–1929), American politician
Lewie Hardage (1891–1973), American college football player and coach